Yamaguchi Sekkei (Japanese: 山口雪渓) also known as Yamaguchi Sōsetsu (山口宗雪) (1644/48, Kyoto - 22 October 1732, Kyoto) was a Japanese artist of the middle Edo period. He sometimes went under the names Baian (梅庵) or Hakuin (白隠).

Life and work 
Although his year of birth is generally considered to be 1644, documents at Kiyomizu-dera suggest that it may have been 1648 or even 1649.

It has been said that he was a great admirer of the artists Muqi (Chinese:牧谿) or "Mokkei" in Japanese, and Sesshū (雪舟) and that he created his art name by combining characters from both of their names. It is also believed that he was a student of Kanō Einō.

He didn't paint in the prevailing styles of his time, but rather used traditional styles to create his own. They are registered as an Important Cultural Property.

Also notable are the murals in the Myōshin-ji. They comprise fifteen landscapes with figures, sixteen scenes with flowers and birds and twelve portraits of Buddhist saints. They are not accessible to the public.

References

Further reading 
 Tazawa, Yutaka: "Yamaguchi Sekkei". In: Biographical Dictionary of Japanese Art. Kodansha International, 1981. .
 Laurance P. Roberts: "Sekkei". In: A Dictionary of Japanese Artists. Weatherhill, 1976. .

External links 

1640s births
1732 deaths
Artists from Kyoto
Kanō school